Azonexus fungiphilus is a species of bacteria. It is a root bacteria and together with Azonexus caeni is one of the two species in the genus.

References

Further reading
Whitman, William B., et al., eds. Bergey's manual® of systematic bacteriology. Vol. 2. Springer, 2012.

External links

Type strain of Azonexus fungiphilus at BacDive -  the Bacterial Diversity Metadatabase

Rhodocyclaceae
Bacteria described in 2000